Te Awamutu is a town in the Waikato region in the North Island of New Zealand. It is the council seat of the Waipa District and serves as a service town for the farming communities which surround it.

Te Awamutu has a population of  making it the fifth-largest urban area in the Waikato behind Hamilton, Taupō, Cambridge and Tokoroa.

The town is often referred to as "The Rose Town of New Zealand" because of its elaborate rose gardens in the centre of the town. Many local businesses use "Rosetown" in their name, and the symbol of the rose is widely used on local signs and billboards. The local paper, Te Awamutu Courier, has a symbol of a rose in the masthead on its front page.

History and culture

Tainui Maori first settled in the area in about 1450, according to noted Tainui historian Te Hurinui-Jones. Te Awamutu means "the river cut short", as it marked the end of the navigable section of the Mangapiko Stream.

Te Awamutu was the birthplace of the first Maori King, Pōtatau Te Wherowhero (died 1860).

The first European missionaries visited the area in 1834. A missionary settlement was set up by Benjamin Yate Ashwell of the Church Missionary Society (CMS). and Māori Christians in July 1839 after they observed Tainui warriors, who had been fighting at Rotorua, return with 60 backpacks of human remains and proceed to cook and eat them in the Otawhao Pa. In 1842 the Rev. John Morgan moved to the Otawhao Mission Station. Otawhao was to the south west of Te Awamutu, on the rise overlooking what is now Centennial Park.

The CMS missionaries established a flourishing trade school that focused on developing agricultural skills. The missionaries introduced European crops such as wheat, potatoes and peaches. In 1846 Morgan provided advice and some capital to help local Māori to construct eight water mills to grind wheat into flour. Morgan assisted in finding a suitable miller to operate the mills and to train Maori in this skill.

Possibly the oldest surviving building in the Waikato is St John's church, built in 1853 as part of the mission station. It is in Gothic Revival style. During the 1850s the wider area prospered on the back of sending surplus farm produce to Auckland. For a brief period wheat was even sent overseas. By the late 1850s prices dropped as cheaper flour and other foodstuffs were imported from Australia. This caused huge resentment among local Māori who had grown use to the wealth provided by trade. Some of the more warlike Māori such as Rewi Maniapoto blamed the missionaries for having a negative influence on Māori tikanga  (cultural practices). He attempted to kill the local missionary and burnt down the trade school and other mission buildings. Some Christian Māori warned Europeans to leave the Waikato as their lives were in danger. Te Awamutu was a major site during the New Zealand Wars of the 19th century, serving as a garrison town for the colonial settlers from 1864. European settlement began at the conclusion of the Waikato Wars (1863–1865).

The local Mangatoatoa Marae and Te Maru o Ihowa meeting house is a meeting place for the Ngāti Maniapoto hapū of Ngutu, Pare te Kawa and Parewaeono, and the Waikato Tainui hapū of Ngāti Ngutu and Ngāti Paretekawa.

Local government 
Rangiaowhia, or Rangiaohia Highway Board administered the roads in the town until Te Awamutu Town Board's election on 1 November 1884. The board first met on 8 November, though there had been an earlier attempt to form a board and there was an unsuccessful challenge to the legality of the election. Te Awamutu Borough Council took over from the board and first met on 10 May 1915. It was merged into Waipā District Council on 23 October 1989.

Geography

Te Awamutu literally means in English "The River's End". The town is on gently undulating land close to the banks of a tributary of the Waipā River. The Waikato Plains lie to the north and east, and the promontory of Mount Pirongia, 20 kilometres to the west, is easily visible. Inside the township are two streams called the Mangapiko Stream and the Mangaohoi Stream. The Mangaohoi ends and becomes the Tributary of the Mangapiko near Memorial park.

The town is close to the extinct Kakepuku and Pirongia volcanoes (and other volcanoes of the Alexandra Volcanic Group). Maungatautari, another extinct volcanic cone, now the site of New Zealand's largest ecological restoration project, is also nearby.

Other towns surrounding Te Awamutu include Cambridge, 25 kilometres to the northeast, Otorohanga, 30 kilometres to the southwest, and Raglan 50 kilometres to the northwest. The small town of Kihikihi lies just to the south of Te Awamutu.

The main thoroughfare is Alexandra Street, so named because it was once the main road to the town of Alexandra (since renamed to Pirongia to avoid confusion with the town of Alexandra in the South Island).

Demographics

Te Awamutu had a population of 12,198 at the 2018 New Zealand census, an increase of 1,578 people (14.9%) since the 2013 census, and an increase of 2,052 people (20.2%) since the 2006 census. There were 4,656 households, comprising 5,787 males and 6,414 females, giving a sex ratio of 0.9 males per female, with 2,421 people (19.8%) aged under 15 years, 2,208 (18.1%) aged 15 to 29, 4,944 (40.5%) aged 30 to 64, and 2,631 (21.6%) aged 65 or older.

Ethnicities were 81.8% European/Pākehā, 23.2% Māori, 2.7% Pacific peoples, 4.5% Asian, and 1.7% other ethnicities. People may identify with more than one ethnicity.

The percentage of people born overseas was 14.7, compared with 27.1% nationally.

Although some people chose not to answer the census's question about religious affiliation, 50.4% had no religion, 37.1% were Christian, 1.1% had Māori religious beliefs, 0.8% were Hindu, 0.2% were Muslim, 0.5% were Buddhist and 1.9% had other religions.

Of those at least 15 years old, 1,317 (13.5%) people had a bachelor's or higher degree, and 2,442 (25.0%) people had no formal qualifications. 1,296 people (13.3%) earned over $70,000 compared to 17.2% nationally. The employment status of those at least 15 was that 4,587 (46.9%) people were employed full-time, 1,308 (13.4%) were part-time, and 393 (4.0%) were unemployed.

For earlier censuses, Te Awamutu was divided into four area units, central, east, south and west, as in this table.  Māori formed 19.7% of the population in central, 22.8% in east, 23.2% in south and 25.7% in west.

Facilities and attractions

Te Awamutu Museum was established in 1935. The museum has a number of permanent exhibitions focusing on the history of Te Awamutu and the surrounding area. There is also an exhibition, 'Everyone is here' focusing on Tim and Neil Finn, brothers and Te Awamutu natives, of the bands Split Enz and later Crowded House.

The museum contains one of the most famous early Māori artifacts, a large carved post known simply as Te Uenuku. This impressive carving has caused much controversy because its style is markedly different from any other early Māori work, yet it is clearly of a Māori design.

Te Awamutu itself is located on SH3, one of the major routes used when touring the North Island of New Zealand.

The town has three large supermarkets, electronics retailers, a well equipped sports / leisure centre and The Kihikihi Trail cycleway, which opened in 2017.

The town has a large dairy factory, and serves as an important centre in the local dairy industry.

Education

There are also three other schools in the town:

Notable residents

The town's best known residents are the Finn Brothers, Tim and Neil, whose musical careers have stretched from Split Enz through the internationally successful Crowded House to their current solo and collaborative works. The town is mentioned in Split Enz's song "Haul Away", and also in Crowded House's 1986 song "Mean to Me", the debut single from their self-titled debut album. Musician Spencer P. Jones (The Beasts of Bourbon, Paul Kelly and The Coloured Girls) was also born in Te Awamutu.

See also
 Te Awamutu Railway Station

References

External links

teawamutu.co.nz

 
Populated places in Waikato
Waipa District
Heritage New Zealand Category 1 historic places in Waikato